Sigrid Margareta Ekström (23 April 1930 – 12 December 2021) was a Swedish poet, novelist, translator, children's writer, literary critic and film critic.

Biography 
Ekström was born in Stockholm in 1930, to Harald Ekström and wife Sigrid Lagervall. She was married to Carl-Eric Nordberg from 1954 to 1969. In the 1960s, she met  the writer, Per Wästberg, and they had a long relationship together that eventually ended. With Wästberg, she had two children; Johanna Ekström, who is also a writer, and Jakob Wästberg, an entrepreneur. In 1996, Ekström suffered a debilitating stroke, and was unable to write, read, or speak, afterwards. She died on 12 December 2021, at the age of 91.

Career 
Ekström had a Bachelor's degree and was a literary critic for Expressen from 1961–1983, and a worked at Sydsvenskan from 1974–1982. During her life, she held several positions in cultural institutions in Sweden, including membership of the Swedish Film Review Council (1960–1967), the Radio Board (1967–1970), as a board member of the Swedish Film Industry (1974–1977) and vice-chairperson of Svenska PEN (1968–1981). She was also a board member of the Swedish Institute (1979–1983) and member of the Bonniernämnden (1971–1985).

Works 
Ekström made her literary debut in 1960 with the short story collection Aftnar i S:t Petersburg. in 1973, she wrote a book addressed to her daughter, titled Ord till Johanna (Words to Johanna). in 1990, she published a collection of poetry titled Skärmar (Screens) to critical acclaim. She notably translated several of Virginia Woolf's books into Swedish, including Orlando, and several stories.

Awards 
 1964 – Albert Bonnier Scholarship Fund for Younger and Newer Writers
 1970 - Literature Promotion Scholarship
 1972 - Vi Magazine Literature Prize
 1977 - Dobloug Prize
 1989 – Gun and Olof Engqvist Scholarship
 1993 - Golden Pen from the Gastronomic Academy
 1997 - The Nine Winter Prize
 1998 - Litteris et Artibus
 2000 – Signe Ekblad-Eldh Prize

References

1930 births
2021 deaths
20th-century Swedish novelists
Dobloug Prize winners
Swedish women novelists
Swedish children's writers
Swedish women children's writers
Litteris et Artibus recipients
Swedish women poets
Swedish women short story writers
Swedish short story writers
20th-century Swedish women writers
20th-century short story writers
Writers from Stockholm